Laver is a surname. Notable people with the surname include:

 Arnold Laver, British timber merchant
 Arthur Laver (1880–1965), South African cricket umpire
 Augustus Laver (1834–1898), Canadian architect
 Basil Laver (1894–1934), British surgeon
 Frank Laver (1869–1919), Australian cricketer and baseball player
 Jack Laver (1917–2017), Australian cricketer
 James Laver (1899–1975), English fashion historian, writer, and curator
 John Laver (1938–2020), British phonetician
 Les Laver (1900–1982), Australian rules footballer
 Richard Laver (1942–2012), American mathematician known for his work in set theory
 Rod Laver (born 1938), Australian tennis player
 Rudolph Laver (1872–1946), German-Australian electrical engineer

See also
 Lavers, a surname
 Leaver
 Lever (surname)